Hajib (also Romanized as Ḩajīb and Hejīb; also known as Jīb) is a village in Zahray-ye Pain Rural District, in the Central District of Buin Zahra County, Qazvin Province, Iran. At the 2006 census, its population was 208, in 45 families.

References 

Populated places in Buin Zahra County